Alnus rhombifolia, the white alder, is an alder tree native to western North America, from British Columbia and Washington east to western Montana, southeast to the Sierra Nevada, and south through the Peninsular Ranges and Colorado Desert oases in Southern California. While not reported in northern Baja California, it has been predicted on the basis of its climatic adaptation to occur there also. Alnus rhombifolia is primarily found in the chaparral and woodlands, montane, and temperate forests ecoregions.

Description

The flowers are produced in catkins. The small winged seeds disperse through the winter, leaving the old woody, blackish 'cones' on the tree for up to a year after.

The white alder is closely related to the red alder (Alnus rubra), differing in the leaf margins being flat, not curled under. Like other alders, it is able to fix nitrogen, and tolerates infertile soils.

Medicinal use
Some Plateau Indian tribes use white alder for female health treatment needs.

References

External links

 Jepson Manual treatment-  Alnus rhombifolia
USDA: Alnus rhombifolia  - data and range maps
Alnus rhombifolia - Photo gallery

rhombifolia
Trees of Western Canada
Trees of the Northwestern United States
Trees of the Southwestern United States
Plants described in 1842
Plants used in traditional Native American medicine
Garden plants of North America
Ornamental trees